The 14th Politburo of the Chinese Communist Party was elected by the 14th Central Committee of the Chinese Communist Party on October 19, 1992. It was preceded by the 13th Politburo of the Chinese Communist Party.  It served until 1997.  It was succeeded by the 15th Politburo of the Chinese Communist Party.

Standing Committee Members
Ordered in political position ranking 
Jiang Zemin
Li Peng
Qiao Shi 
Li Ruihuan 
Zhu Rongji 
Liu Huaqing
Hu Jintao

Members
In stroke order of surnames:
Ding Guangen, Secretary of the Secretariat, Head of the Propaganda Department
Tian Jiyun, Vice Chairman of the National People's Congress
Zhu Rongji, Vice Premier, Governor of the People's Bank of China (1992–1995)
Qiao Shi, Chairman of the National People's Congress
Liu Huaqing, Vice Chairman of the Central Military Commission
Jiang Zemin, General Secretary of the Communist Party, President of the People's Republic of China, Chairman of the Central Military Commission
Li Peng, Premier of the State Council
Li Lanqing, Vice Premier of the State Council
Li Tieying, State Councilor
Li Ruihuan, Chairman of the Chinese People's Political Consultative Conference
Yang Baibing, no other role
Wu Bangguo, Party Secretary of Shanghai (until 1994), Secretary of the Secretariat (from 1994), Vice Premier (from 1994)
Zou Jiahua, Vice Premier
Chen Xitong, Party Secretary of Beijing (expelled in 1995)
Hu Jintao, Secretary of the Secretariat (first-ranked)
Jiang Chunyun, Party Secretary of Shandong (until 1994), Secretary of the Secretariat (from 1994), Vice Premier of the State Council (from 1995)
Qian Qichen, Vice Premier of the State Council, Minister of Foreign Affairs
Wei Jianxing, Party Secretary of Beijing (1995–1997)
Xie Fei, Party Secretary of Guangdong
Tan Shaowen, Party Secretary of Tianjin
Huang Ju, Party Secretary of Shanghai (elected in 1994)

Alternate Member
Ordered in the number of ballots
Wen Jiabao, Secretary of the Secretariat, generally responsible for rural affairs
Wang Hanbin, Vice Chairman of the National People's Congress

External links 
  Gazette of the 1st Session of the 14th CPC Central Committee

Politburo of the Chinese Communist Party
1992 in China